Audiofy bookchip is a proprietary form of distributing audio books on SD cards, most notably used in Pimsleur language courses. The cards can be played with Audiofy's battery-powered player, or by a computer that can run the software on the card.

References

Sound technology